The 1950 Massachusetts general election was held on November 7, 1950, throughout Massachusetts. Primary elections took place on September 19.

At the federal level, Republicans maintained their majority in the state by holding eight of fourteen seats in the United States House of Representatives. Incumbents were re-elected in each House seat.

In the race for Governor, Democratic incumbent Paul Dever was re-elected over former Lieutenant Governor Arthur W. Coolidge. 

Democratic incumbents swept the six elections for statewide offices.

Governor

Democratic incumbent Paul A. Dever was reelected over Republican Arthur W. Coolidge, Socialist Labor candidate Horace Hillis, and Prohibition candidate Mark R. Shaw.

Lieutenant Governor
Democratic incumbent Charles F. Sullivan was reelected over Republican Laurence Curtis and Socialist Labor candidate Lawrence Gilfedder.

Democratic primary

Candidates
William N. Bergan, Hull selectman
G. Edward Bradley, Mayor of Somerville
John Francis Cahill, former Democratic State Committee Chair
J. Frank Murphy
Charles F. Sullivan, incumbent Lieutenant Governor

Results

Republican primary

Candidates
Laurence Curtis, former Treasurer and Receiver-General of Massachusetts
Warren G. Harris, former Governor's Councilor
Daniel E. McLean, former Mayor of Beverly
Harris S. Richardson, State Senator
Robert W. Welch, Jr., businessman and anti-communist activist

Results

General election

Attorney General
Incumbent Francis E. Kelly Attorney General defeated Benjamin F. Chesky, Eli Y. Krovitsky, Isadore H. Y. Muchnick in the Democratic primary and Republican Frederick Ayer Jr., Socialist Workers candidate Anthony Martin, and Prohibition candidate Howard B. Rand in the general election.

Democratic primary

Candidates
Benjamin F. Chesky
Francis E. Kelly, incumbent Attorney General
Eli Y. Krovitsky
Isadore H. Y. Muchnick, member of the Boston School Committee

Results

Republican primary

Candidates
Frederick Ayer Jr., Republican Party fundraiser and nephew of George S. Patton
Edward Butterworth, former State Representative
George Fingold, member of the Malden City Council
Edwin W. Hadley, professor at Northeastern University School of Law
Frank F. Walters

Results

General election

Secretary of the Commonwealth

Democratic primary

Candidates
Anthony L. Bruno
Stephen J. Carr
Edward J. Cronin, incumbent Secretary of the Commonwealth
Martin Graham
Paul V. Shaughnessy, member of the Waltham School Committee
Alfred L. Smith
Alfred R. Vitale
John F. Welch

Results

Republican primary

Candidates
John Adams
William B. Bailey, former State Representative
Henry Clay
Douglas Lawson
Ranny Weeks, bandleader
Russell A. Wood, former Massachusetts Auditor and State Representative
Ada F. York

Results

General election

Treasurer and Receiver-General

Republican primary

Candidates
Fred J. Burrell, former Treasurer and Receiver-General
Roy C. Papalia, Watertown selectman

Results

General election

Auditor

Republican primary

Candidates
William G. Andrew
Warren A. Rood

Results

General election

See also
 157th Massachusetts General Court (1951–1952)

References

 
Massachusetts